Allioli may refer to:

 Allioli, the Valencian variant of the garlic sauce Aioli
 Joseph Franz von Allioli (1793-1873), Roman Catholic theologian and orientalist